Hans-Karl von Unger (5 December 1930 – 17 April 2021) was a German politician.

Biography
After he completed his secondary studies, von Unger studied mechanical engineering at the University of Hanover from 1951 to 1957. He served as director general of a subsidiary from 1980 to 1992 and subsequently became an independent consultant.

In 1963, von Unger joined the Christian Democratic Union of Germany (CDU) and served as a Municipal Councilor for Duisburg from 1979 to 1990. From 1980 to 1995, he was a member of the Landtag of North Rhine-Westphalia for the CDU.

Hans-Karl von Unger died on 17 April 2021 at the age of 90.

Distinctions
Knight of the Order of Saint John

References

1930 births
2021 deaths
German politicians
Members of the Landtag of North Rhine-Westphalia
Christian Democratic Union of Germany politicians
University of Hanover alumni
People from Wunstorf